Louis Carpenter (1829, New York – 1863, Kansas) was a Judge in Douglas County, Kansas and was the highest ranking civic member of the town of Lawrence to be murdered by Quantrill's raiders during the Lawrence Massacre.

Douglas County Kansas
Louis Carpenter was a lawyer, and was a Deputy Clerk of Douglas County, Kansas by June 14, 1859.  In late 1860 or early 1861, he became Probate Judge of Douglas County, the first case bearing his name as judge being recorded on February 26, 1861, and on September 29, 1862, he was chosen by the Union Party as their candidate for the office of Attorney General of Kansas. He was enumerated in the 1860 federal census of the Kansas Territory as age 29, born in the state of New York.

Lawrence Massacre
Judge Carpenter was one of the 185-200 men and boys killed in the Lawrence Massacre on August 21, 1863.  He was murdered in his home at 943 New Hampshire Street in Lawrence by members of Quantrill’s Raiders.  A detailed account of Judge Carpenter's life and murder in Kansas, and a photograph of him, are posted at the Douglas County Law Library website.

Personal
Louis Carpenter was born December 14, 1829 in New York state. His parentage is currently unknown as well as most of his life before coming to Kansas.

Louis married on October 10, 1862 at the home of his bride’s sister and brother-in-law Abigail (Barber) and Grosvenor C. Morse at Emporia, Kansas to Mary E. Barber, who was born ca. 1838 in Massachusetts according to census records.  In 1870, his widow was enumerated at Topeka, Kansas; she married second on January 5, 1871 at Emporia, Kansas to John C. Rankin, and was enumerated in Osage County, Kansas in 1900 and 1910.  She was a sister of Harriet A. Barber, who never married, and Abigail Barber, who married Grosvenor C. Morse.

References

Further reading
Definitive biography and photograph of Judge Louis Carpenter by Kerry Altenbernd:http://www.douglascolawlibrary.org/Louis_Carpenter.html.

1829 births
1863 deaths
People of Kansas in the American Civil War
Civilians killed in the American Civil War
Politicians from Lawrence, Kansas
People murdered in Kansas
19th-century American lawyers